Kate Snell is a British author and filmmaker. She researched the life of Princess Diana and published a book, Diana Her Last Love (2000), which is the basis for the film, Diana (2013) and British Indian actor Naveen Andrews as Dr. Hasnat Khan.  A reissue of Diana Her Last Love appeared as a tie-in to the film and was published in August 2013 by Andre Deutsch, an imprint of Carlton Books.

Snell's book Deceived (2007), about conman Robert Freegard, who posed as a spy for 10 years, was published by Orion Books. Deceived was written following the 2005 production of the award-winning feature-length documentary, The Spy Who Stole My Life, which was directed by Snell and produced by her production company, Creative Touch Films.
Snell is a former reporter for the BBC's Woman’s Hour, a producer of BBC current affairs programme Panorama, and Series Producer for the BBC’s foreign affairs strand Correspondent.

Snell has directed numerous documentaries, including an examination of Shell’s role in the execution of human rights activist Ken Saro-Wiwa; an undercover exposé of the treatment of circus animals, which culminated in the conviction of Mary Chipperfield for cruelty to animals; and a film for BBC2 on Israel at 50. She was the executive producer of Channel 4’s profile of Cherie Blair.  During the Clinton administration, Snell gained behind-the-scenes access to the White House,  becoming the first television director ever to film the ‘gaggle’ – the morning meeting between the President’s communications director and the White House press corps.

References

External links

Year of birth missing (living people)
Living people